Semioscopis oculella is a species of moth of the family Depressariidae. It is found in most of Europe (except most of the Balkan Peninsula, the Iberian Peninsula, Great Britain, and Ireland) east to the eastern parts of the Palearctic realm.

The wingspan is 24–34 mm. Adults are on wing from March to April.

The larvae feed on Betula species.

References

External links
lepiforum.de

Semioscopis
Moths described in 1794
Moths of Europe